MFK Zemplín Michalovce is a Slovak professional football team based in the town of Michalovce, that competes in the Fortuna Liga, the top tier in the Slovak football league system, from 2015–16.

History
Zemplín Michalovce was formed in 1912. Football in Michalovce first played in the summer of 1912, where Michalovce loss against FK Pozdišovce 0–6. The second club, which was based in Michalovce is called NAC Michalovce (Nagymihályi athlétikai club) in 1914.
On 13 June 2015, they defeated their main rival MFK Skalica in a decisive match 2–0 away win, secured their first place and a historic promotion to the Fortuna Liga.

Events Timeline
 1912 – Founded as Michalovský FS (Michalovský futbalový spolok)
 1914 – Renamed Nagymihályi AC (Nagymihályi athleticai club)
 1922 – Merged with ČsŠK Michalovce  to Michalovský AC (Michalovský atletický club)
 1926 – Renamed ŠK Michalovce (Športový klub Michalovce)
 1928 – Merged with Törökvés Michalovce to  ŠK Snaha Michalovce
 1931 – Renamed FAK Michalovce (Futbalový a atletický klub Michalovce)
 1938 – Renamed ŠK Zemplín Michalovce (Športový klub Zemplín Michalovce)
 1945 - Renamed TJ Zemplín Vihorlat Michalovce (Telovýchovná jednota Zemplín Vihorlat Michalovce)
 1991 - Renamed MFK Zemplín Michalovce (Mestský futbalový klub Zemplín Michalovce)

Honours

Domestic
 Czechoslovakia
 1.SNL (1st Slovak National football league) (1969–93)
  Winners (1): 1974–75
 Slovakia
 Slovak Second Division (1993–)
  Winners (1): 2014–15 (Promoted)
  Runners-up (1): 2013–14
 Slovak Cup  (1961–present)
 Semi-finals (1):  2016–17

Affiliated clubs
The following clubs are affiliated with Zemplín Michalovce:
  AC Milan (2011–present)
  FK Sobrance-Sobranecko (2020–present)

Rivalries
MFK Zemplín's biggest rivals are clubs from eastern Slovakia as 1. FC Tatran Prešov, Partizán Bardejov, FK Bodva, FK Humenné and near TJ FK Veľké Revištia. Smaller rivalry is with other teams from the east, Lokomotíva Košice, MFK Vranov nad Topľou, FK Slavoj Trebišov, FK Spišská Nová Ves, ŠK Odeva Lipany. MFK Zemplín Michalovce supporters called Ultras Zemplín Michalovce (GS-52) maintain friendly relations with fans of VSS Košice called as Viva Košice.

Sponsorship

Club partners
source
Scorp
ISDB
Eurovia
City of Michalovce
Thermal Park Šírava
Bel
FIN.M.O.S.

Current squad
As of 18 February 2023.

For recent transfers, see List of Slovak football transfers winter 2022-23.

Out on loan 2022–23

Staff

Current technical staff
As of 22 March 2022

Results

League and Cup historySlovak League only (1993–present)Player records

Most goals

Players whose name is listed in bold are still active.

Notable players
The following players collected seniorinternational caps for their respective countries. Players whose name is listed in bold represented their countries while playing for Zemlín.Past (and present) players who are the subjects of Wikipedia articles can be found here. Amadou Coulibaly
 Vernon De Marco
 Pavol Diňa
 Pablo Gállego
 Andrej Hesek
 Jakub Hromada
 Vladimír Janočko
 Akaki Khubutia
 Martin Koscelník
 Doriano Kortstam
 Sainey Njie
 Kristi Qose
 Martin Raška
 Martin Regáli
 Lazaros Rota
 Ousmane Samba
 Issa Modibo Sidibé
 Miroslav Seman
 Danilo Špoljarić
 Dušan Sninský
 Michal Škvarka
 Kévin Zonzon
 Igor Žofčák

Managers

 Štefan Nadzam (1973-77)
 Štefan Nadzam (1981-87)
 Ján Kozák (2002-03)
 Jozef Škrlík (2004)
 Ján Karaffa (2005)
 Ladislav Molnár (2006)
 Mikuláš Komanický (2008–09)
 Vladimír Rusnák (2009–10)
 Vlastimil Petržela (2010–12)
 Albert Rusnák (2012–14)
 Jozef Bubenko (2013)
 Ondrej Duda (2014)
 František Šturma (2014 – 30 Dec 2015)
 Stanislav Griga (30 Dec 2015 – 30 May 2016)
 Anton Šoltis (7 June 2016 – 11 Nov 2019)
 Jozef Majoroš (11 Nov 2019–13 April 2021)
 Anton Šoltis (April 2021 – June 2021)
 Miroslav Nemec (June 2021 – March 2022)
 Norbert Hrnčár (March 2022 – present'')

References

External links
 Official website 
 

 
Football clubs in Slovakia
Association football clubs established in 1912
MFK Zemplin Michalovce